Singye may refer to:
Singye County, North Hwanghae Province, North Korea
Singye Station, railway station in the county
Singye-dong, neighbourhood (dong) of Yongsan District, Seoul, South Korea

See also
Singye Dzong, town in Luentse District, Bhutan
Singye Temple, Buddhist temple in Kosong County, Kangwon Province, North Korea